The 2014 Cavan Intermediate Football Championship was the 50th edition of Cavan GAA's premier Gaelic football tournament for intermediate graded clubs in County Cavan, Ireland. The tournament consists of 14 teams, with the winner representing Cavan in the Ulster Intermediate Club Football Championship.

Cootehill won the championship after a comfortable win over Ballyhaise in the final.

Team Changes
The following teams have changed division since the 2013 championship season.

To Championship
Promoted from 2013 Cavan Junior Football Championship
  Kill Shamrocks - (Junior Champions)
Relegated from 2013 Cavan Senior Football Championship
  Belturbet

From Championship
Promoted to 2014 Cavan Senior Football Championship
  Killeshandra - (Intermediate Champions)
Relegated to 2014 Cavan Junior Football Championship
  Ballymachugh

Opening rounds

Preliminary round

Round 1

Back-door stage

Round 2

Round 3

Knock-out stage

Quarter-finals

Semi-finals

Final

Relegation play-offs

Semi-final

Final

References

Cavan Intermediate Football Championship
Cavan GAA Football championships